Mathare is a constituency in Nairobi. It is one of seventeen constituencies in Nairobi City County. It was created prior to the 2013 general election, when Starehe Constituency boundaries were revised. It borders Ruaraka Constituency to the north; Roysambu and Westlands constituencies to the northwest; Embakasi Central Constituency to the east; Kamukunji Constituency to the south; and Starehe Constituency to the west.

It has six electoral wards namely; Hospital, Mabatini, Huruma, Ngei, Mlango Kubwa, and Kiamaiko.

Mathare Sub-county
The Sub-county shares the same boundaries with the constituency. The Sub-county is headed by the sub-county administrator, appointed by a County Public Service Board.

References 

Constituencies in Nairobi
Constituencies established in 2013
2013 establishments in Kenya